Tornatellinops jacksonensis, also known as the Port Jackson miniature treesnail, is a species of tree snail that is endemic to Australia.

Description
The elongately conical shell of adult snails is 3.3–3.5 mm in height, with a diameter of 1.4–1.5 mm, with a high spire, weakly impressed sutures and rounded whorls. It is pale golden-brown in colour. The umbilicus is imperforate. The aperture is subovate.

Habitat
The snail occurs in south-eastern Australia from Queensland southwards to Tasmania, as well as on Lord Howe Island and Norfolk Island in the Tasman Sea. It inhabits trees and leaf litter.

References

 
jacksonensis
Gastropods of Australia
Gastropods of Lord Howe Island
Taxa named by James Charles Cox
Gastropods described in 1864